is a train station in Suma-ku, Kobe, Hyōgo Prefecture, Japan.

History

The permanent Suma Station opened in July 1912, in preparation for a westward extension to Ichinotani (a now-closed station between here and Sumaura-kōen) on July 11. The station was renamed  (lit. 'The Station in front of (JGR) Suma Station) on April 12, 1917. On April 1, 1927, the railway was merged into the Ujigawa Electric Company, only to be sold off on June 6, 1933. Sanyō Electric Railway (nothing to do with the electronics company founded in 1950) renamed the station  (lit. Electric Railway [as opposed to the JGR line, which was not electrified until 1964] Suma Station) in 1943 and elevated the station in August 1947. Limited Expresses started calling here in September 1957, and the platforms were extended in November 1967. Due to the opening of the Kōbe Rapid Transit Railway on April 7, 1968, Hankyū and Hanshin trains start calling here. Exactly 23 years later, the station receives its current name. The station, like many others in the Kobe area, was closed in the aftermath of the Great Hanshin earthquake on January 17, 1995; services to Sumadera resumed on April 9 that year, followed ten days later by services to Sumaura-kōen.

Lines
Sanyo Electric Railway
Sanyo Electric Railway Main Line

Layout
From here a subway leads to two island platforms.

Services

Trains run 0500-0015 every day. The typical hourly weekday off-peak service is:
6 trains to Hanshin Umeda, of which:
2 are Hanshin-Sanyō Through Limited Expresses (calling at Tsukimiyama, Itayado, Kōsoku Nagata, Shinkaichi, Kōsoku Kōbe, Motomachi, Kobe Sannomiya, Mikage, Uozaki, Ashiya, Nishinomiya, Kōshien, Amagasaki and Umeda)
4 are Hanshin-Sanyō Through Limited Expresses or Hanshin Limited Expresses running local until Kobe Sannomiya (calling at all stations until Kobe Sannomiya, then Mikage, Uozaki, Ashiya, Nishinomiya, Kōshien, Amagasaki and Umeda)
2 local trains to Hankyū Sannomiya
8 trains to Sanyō Himeji, of which:
4 are Hanshin-Sanyō Through Limited Expresses (calling at Tarumi, Maiko-kōen, Akashi, Higashi-Futami, Takasago, Ōshio, Shikama and Himeji)
4 are local (these trains are overtaken at Kasumigaoka)
2 trains to Sumaura-kōen only

References
This article incorporates material translated from 山陽須磨駅 (Sanyō Suma Eki) in the Japanese Wikipedia, retrieved March 21, 2010.

Railway stations in Hyōgo Prefecture
Railway stations in Japan opened in 1912